Welcome to Momoland is the debut extended play by South Korean girl group Momoland. It was released by Duble Kick Entertainment and distributed by Kakao M on November 10, 2016. For the extended play, Momoland worked with a variety of producers including Duble Sidekick, Tenzo & Tasco, Jake K, Yokan and Full8loom. Welcome to Momoland consists of six tracks including the group's debut single "Jjan! Koong! Kwang!" and its instrumental and four other new tracks. The album was crowdfunded to cover the cost for producing the physical format.

To promote the extended play, the group performed on several South Korean music show programs, such as M Countdown and Inkigayo. Commercially, the album peaked at number twenty-eight on South Korea's Gaon Album Chart.

Background and release
Momoland was formed in Mnet's survival reality show Finding Momoland which premiered in June 2016. Created by Duble Kick Entertainment, which a group of seven members were selected from ten trainees. According to Duble Sidekick in September 2016, the debut single of the group was delayed due to lack of spectators and the group failed to gather the amount they needed. The group's debut was later successfully crowdfunded, raising about 10 million won.

Momoland held their debut showcase on November 9, 2016. Welcome to Momoland was released on November 10, 2016 by Duble Kick Entertainment and distributed by Kakao M as the group's debut extended play.

Promotion
Momoland made their debut performance of their single "Jjan! Koong! Kwang!" on November 10, 2016 through music television program M Countdown. The group also promoted "Jjan! Koong! Kwang!" on several music programs in South Korea including Inkigayo, Music Bank, Show Champion, Show! Music Core and Simply K-Pop. "Welcome to Momoland" and "Jjan! Koong! Kwang!" were also performed on The Show.

Singles
On October 20, 2016, the group's debut single was officially announced. Duble Sidekick was also reported to have worked on the single. Prior to the release, a teaser of "Jjan! Koong! Kwang!" and its music video were released online on November 3, 2016. The single was released on November 10, 2016 by Duble Kick Entertainment and distributed by Kakao M as the group's debut single. It served as the lead single for their first extended play, Welcome to Momoland. The accompanying music video for the song was uploaded onto 1theK's YouTube channel simultaneously with the single's release. Bae Yoon Jung of Yama & Hot Chicks served as the choreographer of the video. A dance version of the music video was released on November 14, 2016. The dance practice video was uploaded on November 16, 2016.

Commercial performance
In South Korea, Welcome to Momoland debuted and peaked at number twenty-eight on the Gaon Album Chart for the week of November 12, 2016. It was the fifty-third best-selling album for the month November 2016 with 1,915 physical copies sold.

Track listing

Charts

Credits and personnel
Credits adapted from Melon.
 Momoland – vocals 
 Duble Sidekick – lyricist , composer 
 Full8loom – arrangement 
 Jake K – composer , arrangement 
 Skylar Mones – composer 
 Andreas Oberg – composer 
 Seion – composer 
 Taewoon – composer , lyricist 
 Tenzo & Tasco – lyricist , composer , arrangement 
 Yokan – composer , lyricist , arrangement 
 Yonghee – lyricist

Release history

References

Momoland albums
2016 debut EPs
Korean-language EPs
Kakao M EPs